Lido Vieri (born 16 July 1939) is a former Italian football manager and former football player who played as a goalkeeper.

He won the 1968 European Championship and was a runner-up at the 1970 FIFA World Cup with the Italy national team.

Club career 
During his club career he played for Torino, Inter and Pistoiese. Vieri won the Coppa Italia with Torino during the 1967–68 season, and the 1970–71 Serie A with Inter.

International career 
Vieri earned 4 caps for the Italy national football team between 1963 and 1968. He was a backup keeper to Dino Zoff and Albertosi in Italy's victorious 1968 UEFA European Football Championship campaign on home soil under manager Ferruccio Valcareggi, and also at the 1970 FIFA World Cup, where Italy reached the final.

Style of play 
A quick, physically strong, consistent, and dominant keeper, regarded as one of the best Italian goalkeepers of his generation, Vieri won the "Premio Combi" during the 1962–63 season, which was awarded to the best goalkeeper in Serie A. Throughout his career he made a name for himself as an aggressive, vocal, and commanding goalkeeper. Vieri was an elegant, courageous, and acrobatic shot-stopper, who was known in particular for his athleticism, spectacular saves, bravery, and ability to rush quickly off his line to collect the ball, as well as his command of the area, leadership, and handling of crosses; despite his goalkeeping ability, he also gained a degree of infamy for his tenacity and strong character throughout his career.

Honours

Club
Torino
Coppa Italia: 1967–68

Inter
Serie A: 1970–71

International
Italy
FIFA World Cup: Runner-up: 1970
UEFA European Football Championship: 1968

References

External links

1939 births
Living people
Italian footballers
People from Piombino
Italy international footballers
Association football goalkeepers
Torino F.C. players
Inter Milan players
U.S. Pistoiese 1921 players
Serie A players
Serie B players
Serie C players
UEFA European Championship-winning players
UEFA Euro 1968 players
1970 FIFA World Cup players
S.S. Juve Stabia managers
Italian football managers
Vigevano Calcio players
Sportspeople from the Province of Livorno
Footballers from Tuscany